Augustus Witschief Bennet (October 7, 1897 – June 5, 1983) was an American politician and a United States representative from New York.

Biography
Born in New York City, New York County, New York  Bennet was a son of U.S. Representative William Stiles Bennet and Gertrude (Witschief) Bennet. He attended the public schools in New York City and Washington, D.C., and  graduated from Amherst College in 1918.

During the First World War, Bennet served in the United States Naval Reserve Flying Corps with the rating of chief quartermaster from June 8, 1918, to January 19, 1919. He graduated from the Columbia University Law School at New York City in 1921, was admitted to the bar the same year.

Career
Bennet commenced practice in Newburgh. He was United States referee in bankruptcy from 1923 to 1944, and was married to Maxine Layne on October 19, 1929.

Elected as a Republican to the Seventy-ninth Congress, Bennet was U. S. Representative for the twenty-ninth district of New York and held that office from January 3, 1945, to January 3, 1947.  He was an unsuccessful candidate for renomination in 1946.

Death
Resuming the practice of law, Bennet resided in Laguna Hills, California, until he died in Concord, Massachusetts, on June 5, 1983 (age 85 years, 241 days). He was cremated, and his ashes are interred at Cedar Hills Mausoleum, Newburgh, New York.

References

External links

1897 births
1983 deaths
Columbia Law School alumni
Politicians from Orange County, New York
Amherst College alumni
Republican Party members of the United States House of Representatives from New York (state)
20th-century American politicians
California Republicans